Liisa Rantalaiho (born January 25, 1933) is a Finnish sociologist, fandom activist, and professor emerita in the fields of sociology of health and gender studies. She writes and performs filk songs.

Early life and education
Liisa Rantalaiho was born January 25, 1933, in Kuorevesi. She defended her Ph.D. thesis in social science in 1968.

Research and career
Rantalaiho served as professor of sociology at the University of Lapland in 1988–1989, and in public health science at the University of Tampere in 1990–1998. A pioneer of women's studies in Finland, she has mainly focused on women's research, gender equality, and changes in working life. Together with Raija Julkunen, she led a research project on the Finnish welfare society and gender roles, which was funded by the Academy of Finland. Rantalaiho, alone or with others, has published a large number of articles in women's research, work life issues, and occupational psychology. She has also edited the research report Hyvinvointivaltion sukupuolijärjestelmä (1989) and has served as editor-in-chief of the journal Naistutkimus-Kvinnoforskning. 

Rantalaiho also serves on the editorial board of the Nordic Journal of Science Fiction and Fantasy Research, and was the guest of honor at the 2010 Finncon.

She was a founding member of the science fiction society, Spektre, has served as a judge of the "Portti" short story competition, and is a book reviewer for Portti magazine. The Finnish Science Fiction Writers Association awarded her with the Cosmos Pen Award in 2006 for her groundbreaking work as an advocate of Finnish science fiction literature.

Awards and honors
 1999, honorary doctorate, University of Lapland

Selected works 
 Naisen historiallisuus: yhteiskunta, yksilö, sukupuoli: seminaariraportti (University of Tampere, 1981) 
 Toimistoautomaatio ja toimistotyö (Tampereen yliopisto, 1984) 
 Miesten tiede, naisten puuhat: yhteiskuntatieteen kritiikkiä naisten työn näkökulmasta (Vastapaino, 1986) 
 Naistutkimuksen tieteidenvälisiä ongelmia: seminaariraportti (Tampereen yliopisto, 1987)

References

1933 births
Living people
Finnish sociologists
Finnish women sociologists
20th-century Finnish writers
20th-century Finnish women writers
Finnish editors
Finnish women editors
Academic journal editors
People from Jämsä
Fandom
Filkers